Desde que amanece apetece is a 2005 Spanish comedy film directed by Antonio del Real and starring Gabino Diego, Arturo Fernández, Loles León and Miguel Ángel Muñoz. The film was awarded the Godoy Award for Worst Spanish film of 2005.

References

External links
 

2005 films
2000s Spanish-language films
Films directed by Antonio del Real
2005 comedy films
Spanish sex comedy films
2000s Spanish films
Films about striptease
Films about prostitution in Spain